Davor Škerjanc (born 7 January 1986) is a retired Slovenian footballer who played as a midfielder.

Career
Škerjanc made his Slovenian PrvaLiga debut with Primorje in 2004. On 14 August 2009, he signed with Olimpija Ljubljana and stayed with the team for the next three-and-a-half seasons. He played half the season with Krka, before moving to Greece in summer 2013 to play with Ethnikos Gazoros. On 31 August 2014, the last day of the Serbian SuperLiga transfer window, he signed a one-year contract with Voždovac.

References

External links

Player profile at NZS 

1986 births
Living people
People from Postojna
Slovenian footballers
Association football midfielders
NK Tabor Sežana players
NK Primorje players
NK Olimpija Ljubljana (2005) players
NK Krka players
FK Voždovac players
FC Koper players
Slovenian expatriate footballers
Slovenian expatriate sportspeople in Greece
Expatriate footballers in Greece
Slovenian expatriate sportspeople in Serbia
Expatriate footballers in Serbia
Slovenian expatriate sportspeople in Italy
Expatriate footballers in Italy
Slovenian Second League players
Slovenian PrvaLiga players
Serbian SuperLiga players
Slovenia youth international footballers
Slovenia under-21 international footballers